Ynys Môn (officially called Anglesey until 1983) is a constituency of the House of Commons of the Parliament of the United Kingdom. It elects one Member of Parliament (MP) by the first past the post system of election.

The Ynys Môn Senedd constituency was created with the same boundaries in 1999 (as an Assembly constituency).

Ynys Môn is represented by Virginia Crosbie of the Conservative Party. Crosbie is the first Conservative to win the constituency since the 1983 general election.

Constituency profile
The seat covers the isles of Anglesey and Holy Island. Incomes and house prices are slightly below average for the UK. Electoral Calculus describes the seat as "Traditionalist", characterised by socially conservative Labour-inclined voters with lower levels of income and formal education.

History
The Laws in Wales Act 1535 (26 Hen. VIII, c. 26) provided for a single county seat in the House of Commons for each of 12 historic Welsh counties (including Anglesey) and two for Monmouthshire. Using the modern year, starting on 1 January, these parliamentary constituencies were authorised in 1536.

The Act contains the following provision, which had the effect of enfranchising the shire of Anglesey:

And that for this present Parliament, and all other Parliaments to be holden and kept for this Realm, one Knight shall be chosen and elected to the same Parliaments for every of the Shires of Brecknock, Radnor, Mountgomery and Denbigh, and for every other Shire within the said Country of Dominion of Wales;

The earliest known results are a fragment of the 1541 returns, in which the name of the Knight of the Shire for Anglesey (as Members of Parliament from county constituencies were known before the 19th century) has been lost. It is not known if Anglesey was represented in the parliaments of 1536 and 1539.

The borough constituency of Newborough, soon renamed Beaumaris, returned a member of parliament for the boroughs of Anglesey. It was abolished in 1885, leaving only the county constituency of Anglesey. The official name of the constituency in English was Anglesey, until it was replaced by the Welsh name . Parliament approved the change, to take effect from the 1983 general election. This was purely an alteration of the official name, as no boundary changes were involved.

Boundaries

Geographically, the constituency of Ynys Môn comprises the whole of the main island of Anglesey and the smaller Holy Island.

The Parliamentary Constituencies Act 2020 amends Schedule 2 to the Parliamentary Constituencies Act 1986 in granting Ynys Môn "protected" status, meaning the boundaries of the constituency cannot be changed in future boundary reviews.

Members of Parliament

MPs 1545–1640

MPs after 1640

Short Parliament
 April 1640: John Bodvel

Long Parliament
 1640–1644: John Bodvel (Royalist) – disabled to sit, 5 February 1644
 1646–1648: Richard Wood – excluded in Pride's Purge, December 1648

Anglesey was unrepresented in Barebone's Parliament

First Protectorate Parliament
1654–1655: Col. George Twisleton
1654–1655: William Foxwist

Second Protectorate Parliament
1656–1658: Col. George Twisleton
1656–1658: Griffith Bodwrda

Third Protectorate Parliament
 1659: Col. George Twisleton

Elections

Elections in the 19th century

Elections in the 1830s 

 Caused by Williams-Bulkeley's resignation

Elections in the 1840s

Elections in the 1850s

Elections in the 1860s

Elections in the 1870s

Elections in the 1880s

Elections in the 1890s

Elections in the 20th century

Elections in the 1900s

Elections in the 1910s

Elections in the 1920s

Elections in the 1930s

Elections in the 1940s

Elections in the 1950s

Elections in the 1960s

Elections in the 1970s

Elections in the 1980s

Elections in the 1990s

Elections in the 21st century

Elections in the 2000s

Elections in the 2010s 

Of the 67 rejected ballots:
51 were either unmarked or it was uncertain who the vote was for.
16 voted for more than one candidate.

 

Of the 121 rejected ballots:
96 were either unmarked or it was uncertain who the vote was for.
24 voted for more than one candidate.
1 had want of official mark.

See also
 Ynys Môn (Senedd constituency)
 List of parliamentary constituencies in Gwynedd
 List of parliamentary constituencies in Wales

References

Further reading
 The House of Commons 1509–1558, by S.T. Bindoff (Secker & Warburg 1982)

 F W S Craig, British Parliamentary Election Results, 1918–1949; Political Reference Publications, Glasgow, 1949
 Keele University, UK General Election Results, 1950

Parliamentary constituencies in North Wales
Politics of Anglesey
Constituencies of the Parliament of the United Kingdom established in 1536